KLCK (1400 kHz) is an AM radio station broadcasting a talk radio format. Licensed to Goldendale, Washington, United States, the station is currently owned by Shannon Milburn and Colette Carpenter, through licensee Gorge Country Media, Inc.

References

External links

LCK (AM)
Klickitat County, Washington
Radio stations established in 1984
1984 establishments in Washington (state)